Bernadine is a female given name, a variant spelling of Bernardine. Notable people with the name include:

 Bernadine Bezuidenhout (born 1993), New Zealand cricketer
 Bernadine Craft, American politician from Wyoming
 Bernadine Custer (1900–1991), American artist
 Bernadene Hayes (1912–1987), American actress
 Bernadine Hayes (c. 1912–1987, American singer and actress
 Bernadine Healy (born 1944), American cardiologist
 Bernadine Kent, American politician from Ohio
 Bernadine Maxwell (died 1988), American All-American Girls Professional Baseball League player
 Bernadine Newsom Denning (1930–2011), American educator and civil rights activist
 Bernadine Oliver-Kerby (born 1971), New Zealand broadcaster

See also
 Bernardine (disambiguation)
 Bernard
 Bernie (given name)
 Bernardine (song), a song by Pat Boone from the 1957 film Bernardine, often misspelled Bernadine
 Nadine (disambiguation)

Given names
Feminine given names
English given names